Crime and Justice Lagos is a 2022 Nigerian Showmax Original mystery, crime, and drama series, starring Folu Storms, Ibrahim Jammal, Margaret Osuome, Paul Adams, Uche Mac-Auley, Ejiroghene Jyro Asagba, Femi Durojaiye, and Makinde Adeniran.

Crime and Justice Lagos is a spin-off from the Crime and Justice series franchise co-produced by Showmax, and Canal+.

Plot
Crime and Justice Lagos revolves around the activities of the fictional Serious and Special Crimes Unit working in Lagos.

Cast
 Folu Storms as Kelechi Farasin
 Ibrahim Jammal as Danladi Dikko
 Margaret Osuome as Simi
 Paul Adams
 Uche Mac-Auley as Dr. Aggy
 Ejiroghene Jyro Asagba
 Femi Durojaiye as DSP Jangfa
 Makinde Adeniran
 William Benson as Femi Biboye

Episode
Each episode is been released weekly, every Thursday on Showmax starting from 8 December 2022.

Season 1 (2022-23)

Production and release
The series executive producer is Yinka Edward, with the help of the co-producer Eustace Okwechime, and director Mak 'Kusare. Crime and Justice Lagos was set in the formal capital of Nigeria, Lagos State and released on Showmax on 8 December 2022, with the official premiere being held at Genesis Cinema, Maryland Lagos on December 6. In attendance at the premiere, were the cast, other Nollywood actors, and the Executive  Head of Content and West Africa Channels at MultiChoice Nigeria, Dr. Busola Tejumola.

Dr. Busola Tejumola at the official premiere, described the show, saying “ is unlike any other Nigerian Original we have put out. We’ve created a crime series that captures the pulse of the city – from its glitzy clubs to its grimy ghettos – through the lens of law enforcement agents tasked with keeping its citizens safe. Each episode mirrors real crime stories that audiences will connect with and will give them a lot to ponder about." Opeoluwa Filani, General Manager of Showmax Nigeria, says “the series demonstrates the streaming service’s commitment to telling authentic African stories.”

Reception

Critical and audience response

Crime and Justice Lagos has received favourable reviews from the public and critics. According to Premium Times writer Shola-Adido Oladotun, wrote “With a stellar lineup of incredible talents and a promising concept, Crime and Justice Lagos reminds us of The Third Eye; a crime drama series aired on NTA from 1990-1993, starring veteran actor Olu Jacobs” and said “The six-part series has so much potential to push Nollywood producers to explore other uncommon genres in the industry.”

References

External links
  
 Crime and Justice Lagos at Showmax

2022 Nigerian television series debuts
2020s crime drama television series
English-language Showmax original programming
Nigerian drama television series